Zero-forcing (or null-steering) precoding is a method of spatial signal processing by which a multiple antenna transmitter can null the multiuser interference in a multi-user MIMO wireless communication system. When the channel state information is perfectly known at the transmitter, the zero-forcing precoder is given by the pseudo-inverse of the channel matrix.

Mathematical description
In a multiple antenna downlink system which comprises  transmit antenna access points and  single receive antenna users, such that , the received signal of user  is described as

The above signal model can be more compactly re-written as

where 
 is the  received signal vector, 
 is  channel matrix, 
 is the  precoding matrix, 
 is a  diagonal power matrix, and 
 is the  transmit signal.

A zero-forcing precoder is defined as a precoder where  intended for user  is orthogonal to every channel vector  associated with users  where . That is,

Thus the interference caused by the signal meant for one user is effectively nullified for rest of the users via zero-forcing precoder.

From the fact that each beam generated by zero-forcing precoder is orthogonal to all the other user channel vectors, one can rewrite the received signal as

The orthogonality condition can be expressed in matrix form as

where  is some  diagonal matrix. Typically,  is selected to be an identity matrix. This makes  the right Moore-Penrose pseudo-inverse of  given by

Given this zero-forcing precoder design, the received signal at each user is decoupled from each other as

Quantify the feedback amount 

Quantify the amount of the feedback resource required to maintain at least a given throughput performance gap between zero-forcing with perfect feedback and with limited feedback, i.e.,

 .

Jindal showed that the required feedback bits of a spatially uncorrelated channel should be scaled according to SNR of the downlink channel, which is given by:

To feed back B bits though the uplink channel, the throughput performance of the uplink channel should be larger than or equal to 'B'

Then, the required feedback resource to satisfy  is 
. 
Note that differently from the feedback bits case, the required feedback resource is a function of both downlink and uplink channel conditions. It is reasonable to include the uplink channel status in the calculation of the feedback resource since the uplink channel status determines the capacity, i.e., bits/second per unit frequency band (Hz), of the feedback link. Consider a case when SNR of the downlink and uplink are proportion such that  is constant and both SNRs are sufficiently high. Then, the feedback resource will be only proportional to the number of transmit antennas

.

It follows from the above equation that the feedback resource is not necessary to scale according to SNR of the downlink channel, which is almost contradict to the case of the feedback bits. One, hence, sees that the whole systematic analysis can reverse the facts resulted from each reductioned situation.

Performance
If the transmitter knows the downlink channel state information (CSI) perfectly, ZF-precoding can achieve almost the system capacity when the number of users is large. On the other hand, with limited channel state information at the transmitter (CSIT) the performance of ZF-precoding decreases depending on the accuracy of CSIT. ZF-precoding requires the significant feedback overhead with respect to signal-to-noise-ratio (SNR) so as to achieve the full multiplexing gain. Inaccurate CSIT results in the significant throughput loss because of residual multiuser interferences. Multiuser interferences remain since they can not be nulled with beams generated by imperfect CSIT.

See also
 Channel state information
 Precoding
 MIMO

References

External links 
Schelkunoff Polynomial Method (Null-Steering) www.antenna-theory.com

IEEE 802
Information theory
Radio resource management
Signal processing